Vincent G. Bourdeau is currently the president of the City College of New York, appointed by the Board of Trustees of The City University of New York on December 4, 2017.

Previously he was a professor of Political Science and a former Director of the International Relations Department and the chair of the Political Science Department and the dean of the Social Science Division.

Education

Vincent G. Bourdeau graduated from Le Moyne College in 1984 with a B.A. in Political Science. Boudreau earned his Ph.D. in Political Science from Cornell University in 1991.

Academic career and promotion
He was a professor of Political Science.  He taught courses titled:  Comparitive Political Economy and Asian Political Systems.  Boudreau was the director of the International Relations Department and the chair of the Political Science Department and the deputy dean of the Social Science Division. Dr. Boudreau was the dean of  the Colin Powell School for Civic Engagement and Global Leadership from years 2002 to 2013.
In 2017, Boudreau was appointed interim President of City College of New York by the City University's board of trustees. In 2018, he became President of the City College of New York.

Controversy

In 2020, CCNY settled a lawsuit with a former professor named Lynda Dodd who claimed that she had been denied tenure and was fired in 2018 for being diagnosed with multiple sclerosis or having a disability. The lawsuit was filed in 2017. The Princeton University professor will receive more than one million dollars in restitution.  She is helping New York State Attorney General Letitia James' office with the investigation into former Governor Andrew Cuomo's alleged sexual misconduct of some former female staffers working for the Governor's office between years 2011 and 2021.

In 2019, President Boudreau fired a lawyer named Michelle Baptiste.  Ms. Baptiste was hired to address possible situations of sexual harassment and other acts of wrongdoing that may have arisen since she was hired in year 2012. She was the third major employee to be fired by Boudreau since 2018. She disagreed with his actions against Lynda Dodd.

References 

Living people
Year of birth missing (living people)
Cornell University alumni
Iona University alumni
City College of New York alumni
City College of New York faculty